The 2014 Shannons Nationals Motor Racing Championships season was the ninth time that the Shannons Nationals Motor Racing Championships were held. The season began 28 March 2014 at Sandown Raceway and finished on 2 November 2014 at Sydney Motorsport Park.

A total of 14 different series held race weekends as part of the Shannons Nationals Motor Racing Championships. Of these, the 2014 seasons of the Australian Manufacturers' Championship, the Australian Production Car Championship, the Australian Saloon Car Series, the Australian Superkart Championship, the Australian Sports Racer Series, the Kerrick Sports Sedan Series and the Kumho V8 Touring Car Series were all held exclusively on the Shannons Nationals calendar. Rounds of the Australian Carrera Cup Championship, the Australian Drivers' Championship, the Australian Formula Ford Series, the Australian GT Championship, the Porsche GT3 Cup Challenge Australia, the PRB Motorsport Series and the Radical Australia Cup were also part of the Shannons Nationals schedule.

Calendar and round winners

Series champions

References

Shannons Nationals Motor Racing Championships